The Keene Swamp Bats are a collegiate summer baseball team based in Keene, New Hampshire. The team, a member of the New England Collegiate Baseball League, plays their home games at Alumni Field. In the NECBL, they are consistently one of the top teams and have reached the league playoffs in 18 of the past 21 seasons. The team also has one of the largest fan bases in the league. Since 2002, they have led the NECBL in attendance three times and have finished outside the top two teams in attendance only once.  This attendance is facilitated by Alumni Field's having the largest official capacity of any NECBL ballpark.

Team history

KEY: ; DNQ - did not qualify

Postseason appearances

 *The NECBL did not separate into divisions until 2001

External links
 Keene Swamp Bats official website
 NECBL

New England Collegiate Baseball League teams
Amateur baseball teams in New Hampshire
1997 establishments in New Hampshire
Keene, New Hampshire
Baseball teams established in 1997